Orinoca is a district (cantón) in the Andamarca Municipality in the Bolivian Sud Carangas Province in  Oruro Department.

Location

Its extension from north to south and from east to west is 35 km. In December 2015, the lake was declared dried up, except for some marshy patches. People in the area had relied on the lake for water for personal and agricultural use.

Population 

The population of the district increased at 34.0% from 1,259 inhabitants (census 1992) to 1,687 inhabitants (2001). There is no urban population in this district. 44.9% of the population are younger than 15 years old; the rate of literacy is 77.7% (1992).

According to studies in 1992, the most spoken language in the province is Aymara, spoken by 97.0%, while 76.7% of the population speak Spanish and 43.3% Quechua (1992). 71.4% of the population are Catholic, 17.5% are Anglican Protestant (1992). 

The village of Isallawi in the Orinoca District is the birthplace of Evo Morales, President of Bolivia from 2006 to 2019.

Living standards

97.5% of the population have no access to running water or sanitary facilities; 100.0% have no electricity (1992).

Economy and infrastructure

The rural population is largely dedicated to agriculture (potatoes, wheat, corn and onions) and raising herds of llamas and vicuñas. Orinoca is accessible only by road; a bus service that reaches the town twice a week.

Division 
The district is subdivided in the following subdistricts and hamlets and villages (localidades), in brackets  the population of 2001:
Orinoca (Parantorre) (1.081)
Comunidad Agua Cruz (67)
Comunidad Ancorcaya (202)
Lagiloma (12)
Estancia Lloco (94)
Estancia Mara Mara (146)
Orinoca (163)
Comunidad Parantorre (7)
Estancia Pucarani (59)
Thola Loma (1)
Estancia Tunavi (87)
Estancia Ichucollo (18)
Calavillca (159)
Chauca (66)
Vice Canton Chihuo (167)
Ayllu Ichura	107
Chihuo	60
Ayllu Ichura (261)
Estancia Pataquiri	82
Comunidad Rosa Pata	179
Calavillca (86)
Lagiloma	27
Thola Loma	59
Ucumasi (47)
Ucumasi (47)
Ayllu Inchura (45)
San Cristobal De Pallini (45)

External links
Province map
 Population data
Subdivisions
Los alimentos escasean en Orinoca (Spanish)

Cantons of Bolivia
Cantons of Oruro Department

de:Kanton Orinoca
qu:Jurinuqa kantun